Mithra ( Miθra,  Miça), commonly known as Mehr, is the Iranian deity of covenant, light, oath, justice and the sun. In addition to being the divinity of contracts, Mithra is also a judicial figure, an all-seeing protector of Truth, and the guardian of cattle, the harvest, and of the Waters. 

The Romans attributed their Mithraic mysteries to Zoroastrian Persian sources relating to Mithra. Since the early 1970s, the dominant scholarship has noted dissimilarities between the Persian and Roman traditions, making it, at most, the result of Roman perceptions of Zoroastrian ideas.

Etymology
Together with the Vedic common noun mitra, the Avestan common noun miθra derives from Proto-Indo-Iranian *mitrám (Mitra), from the root *mi- "to bind", with the "tool suffix" -tra- "causing to". Thus, etymologically mitra/miθra means "that which causes binding", preserved in the Avestan word for "Covenant, Contract, Oath".

In Middle Iranian languages (Middle Persian, Parthian etc.), miθra became mihr, from which New Persian  mehr and Armenian mihr/mehr ultimately derive.

In scripture
Like most other Divinities, Mithra is not mentioned by name in the Gathas, the oldest texts of Zoroastrianism and traditionally attributed to Zoroaster himself, or by name in the Yasna Haptanghaiti, a seven-verse section of the Yasna liturgy that is linguistically as old as the Gathas. As a member of the Iranian ahuric triad, along with Ahura Mazda and Ahura Berezaiti (Apam Napat), Mithra is an exalted figure. Together with Rashnu "Justice" and Sraosha "Obedience", Mithra is one of the three judges at the Chinvat Bridge, the "Bridge of Separation" that all souls must cross. Unlike Sraosha, Mithra is not, however, a psychopomp, a guide of souls to the place of the dead. Should the Good Thoughts, Words, and Deeds outweigh the Bad, Sraosha alone conveys the Soul across the Bridge.

As the Divinity of Contract, Mithra is undeceivable, infallible, eternally watchful, and never-resting. Mithra is additionally the protector of cattle, and his stock epithet is "of Wide Pastures." He is Guardian of the waters and ensures that those pastures receive enough of it.

The lack of Mithra's presence in the texts was once a cause of some consternation amongst Iranians. An often-repeated speculation of the first half of the 20th century was that the lack of any mention (i.e., Zoroaster's silence) of Mithra in these texts implied that Zoroaster had rejected Mithra. This ex silentio speculation is no longer followed. Building on that speculation was another series of speculations, which postulated that the reason why Zoroaster did not mention Mithra was that the latter was the supreme God of a bloodthirsty group of daeva-worshipers that Zoroaster condemned. However, "no satisfactory evidence has yet been adduced to show that, before Zoroaster, the concept of a supreme god existed among the Iranians, or that among them Mithra – or any other divinity – ever enjoyed a separate cult of his or her own outside either their ancient or their Zoroastrian pantheons."

The Avestan Hymn to Mithra (Yasht 10) is the longest, and one of the best-preserved, of the Yashts. Mithra is described in the Zoroastrian Avesta scriptures as "Mithra of Wide Pastures, of the Thousand Ears, and of the Myriad Eyes," (Yasna 1:3), "the Lofty, and the Everlasting... the Province Ruler,"(Yasna 1:11), "the Yazad (Divinity) of the Spoken Name" (Yasna 3:5), and "the Holy," (Yasna 3:13). The Khorda Avesta (Book of Common Prayer) also refer to Mithra in the Litany to the Sun, "Homage to Mithra of Wide Cattle Pastures," (Khwarshed Niyayesh 5), "Whose Word is True, who is of the Assembly, Who has a Thousand Ears, the Well-Shaped One, Who has Ten Thousand Eyes, the Exalted One, Who has Wide Knowledge, the Helpful One, Who Sleeps Not, the Ever Wakeful. We sacrifice to Mithra, The Lord of all countries, Whom Ahura Mazda created the most glorious, Of the Supernatural Yazads. So may there come to us for Aid, Both Mithra and Ahura, the Two Exalted Ones,"(Khwarshed Niyayesh 6-7), "I shall sacrifice to his mace, well-aimed against the Skulls of the Daevas" (Khwarshed Niyayesh 15). Some recent theories have claimed Mithra represents the Sun itself, but the Khorda Avesta refers to the Sun as a separate entity – as it does with the Moon, with which the Sun has "the Best of Friendships," (Khwarshed Niyayesh 15).

In inscriptions
Although there is no known Mithraic iconography in the Achaemenid period, the deity is invoked in several royal Achaemenid inscriptions:

In Artaxerxes II's (r. 404 – 358 B.C.) trilingual (Old Persian, Elamite, and Babylonian) inscription at Susa (A2Sa) and Hamadan (A2Hc), which have the same text, the emperor appeals to "Ahuramazda, Anahita, and Mithra protect me against all evil," and in which he beseeches them to protect what he has built.

Although the Behistun inscription of Darius I (r. 522 – 486 B.C.) invokes Ahuramazda and "the Other Gods who are", this inscription of Artaxerxes II is remarkable as no Achaemenid king before him had invoked any but Ahura Mazda alone by name. Boyce suggests that the reason for this was that Artaxerxes had chosen Anahita and Mithra as his patron/protector Divinities.

Mithra has invoked again in the single known inscription of Artaxerxes III, A3Pa, found at Persepolis. In that inscription, that emperor to appeals to "Ahuramazda and the God Mithra preserve me, my country, and what has been built by me."

In tradition

In the Zoroastrian calendar, the sixteenth day of the month and the seventh month of the year are dedicated to and are under the protection of Mithra. The Iranian civil calendar of 1925 adopted Zoroastrian month-names, and as such also has the seventh month of the year named "Mihr". The position of the sixteenth day and seventh month reflects Mithra's rank in the hierarchy of the Divinities; the sixteenth day and seventh month are respectively the first day of the second half of the month and the first month of the second half of the year. The day on which the day-name and month-name dedications intersect is (like all other such intersections) dedicated to the divinity of that day/month, and is celebrated with a Jashan (from Avestan Yasna, "Worship") in honor of that Divinity. In the case of Mithra, this was Jashan-e Mehregan, or just Mehregan for short.

In Zoroastrian scripture, Mithra is distinct from the divinity of the Sun, Hvare-khshaeta (literally "Radiant Sun", from which the Middle Persian word Khorshed for the Sun). However, in Zoroastrian tradition, Mithra evolved from being an all-seeing figure (hence vaguely associated with the Sun) into a divinity co-identified with the Sun itself, effectively taking over Hvare-khshaeta's role. It is uncertain how and when and why this occurred, but it is commonly attributed to conflation with the Babylonian sun god Shamash and/or the Greek deity Apollo, with whom Mithra shares multiple characteristics such as a judicial function and association with the Sun. This characteristic is part of Mithra's Indo inheritance in that the Indic Rigveda have solar divinities that are not distinct from Mithra/Mitra and Mitra is associated with sunrise in the Atharvaveda. Sun Salutation is a daily yogic activity worldwide even in current times and is preceded by chanting "OM Mitraya Namaha", where "Mitraya" is one of the 108 Names for Lord Surya/Sun God.

Royal names incorporating Mithra's (e.g., "Mithradates") appear in the dynasties of Parthia, Armenia, and in Anatolia, in Pontus and Cappadocia.

The youthful Apollonian-type Mithra is found in images from other countries of Iranian culture in the Parthian period, such as Commagene in the Roman-Parthian border and the Kushan Empire on the Indo-Iranian border.

In Manichaeism
Persian and Parthian-speaking Manichaeans used the name of Mithra current in their time (Mihryazd, q.e. Mithra-yazata) for two different Manichaean angels.

 The first, called Mihryazd by the Persians, was the "Living Spirit" (Aramaic rūḥā ḥayyā), a savior-figure who rescues the "First Man" from the demonic Darkness into which he had plunged.
 The second, known as Mihr or Mihr Yazd among the Parthians, is the "Messenger" (Aramaic īzgaddā), likewise a savior figure, but one concerned with setting up the structures to liberate the Light lost when the First Man had been defeated.

The second figure mentioned above, the Third Messenger, was the helper and redeemer of mankind, and identified with another Zoroastrian divinity, Narisaf (derived from Pahlavi Narsēh from Avestan Nairyō.saȵhō, meaning 'Potent Utterance', the name of a Yazata). Citing Boyce, Sundermann remarks, "It was among the Parthian Manicheans that Mithra as a Sun God surpassed the importance of Narisaf as the common Iranian image of the Third Messenger; among the Parthians the dominance of Mithra was such that his identification with the Third Messenger led to cultic emphasis on the Mithraic traits in the Manichaean God."

Unrelated to these Mihrs are Parthian and Sogdian Mytr or Mytrg. Although sharing linguistic roots with the name Mithra, Werner Sundermann established that those names denote Manicheanism’s equivalent of Maitreya.

In literature

According to Boyce, the earliest literary references to the mysteries are by the Latin poet Statius, about 80 CE, and Plutarch (c. 100 CE).

See also
Mithraism
Mitra
Mitra (Vedic)
Maitreya
Verethragna
List of solar deities

References

Bibliography

.
.
Dumézil, Georges (1948), Mitra-Varuna: Essai sur deux représentations indo-européennes de la souveraineté, 2nd edn. Paris: Gallimard, 1948 (1st edn. 1940); trans. as Mitra-Varuna: An Essay on Two Indo-European Representations of Sovereignty by Derek Coleman, New York: Zone Books, 1988.

External links

Yazatas
Light gods
Justice gods
Solar gods
Mithraism

ca:Mitra (mitologia)
de:Mithra
et:Mithra
el:Μίθρας
fr:Mitra
id:Mithra
lt:Mitra (dievas)
no:Mithra
ro:Mithra
ru:Митра (бог)
tr:Mithra